The Solemn Novena to St. Gerard Majella is held over 9 days in St. Joseph's Redemptorist Church, Dundalk, Ireland.  It runs from 8 to 16 October.

About St. Gerard Majella 

Gerard was born as Gerardo Majella on 9 April 1726 in Muro Lucano, Italy. He was the son of a tailor who died when Gerard was 12, leaving the family in poverty. Gerard tried to join the Capuchin order, but his health prevented it. He was accepted as a Redemptorist lay brother serving his congregation as sacristan, gardener, ostiarius, infirmarian, and tailor.

He was a man of great depth, insight, prayer and kindness. Unfortunately his health was never good.  He died on 16 October 1755, at 29 years of age. Gerard was beatified on 29 January 1893 by Pope Leo XIII, and was canonised on 11 December 1904 by Pope Pius X. The feast day of Saint Gerard Majella is 16 October.

He is a saint whose intercession is requested for children (and unborn children in particular); childbirth; mothers (and expectant mothers in particular); motherhood; falsely accused people; good confessions; lay brothers; and Muro Lucano, Italy.

He was featured on an Italian 45-euro postage stamp in May 2005.

The Redemptorists Annual Nine Day Novena

History
St. Joseph's Parish Church,a Redemptorist House in Dundalk, welcomes thousands of people from all over Ireland to the Annual Festival of Faith in Honour of St. Gerard Majella. It's the biggest festival of faith in Ireland with an average of 10,000 attending on a daily basis.

After Bro. Gerard's Beatification in 1893, a triduum in his honour was preached in St. Joseph's by Fr. Hall, widely regarded as one of the greatest preachers of his day.  The people of Dundalk took St. Gerard into their hearts after this sermon and continued to pay devotion to him on a regular basis.  During the 1930s, Fr. John Murray, started the Annual Nine Day Novena to St. Gerard Majella, beginning on 8 October and finishing on his feast day, 16 October.  Fr. Hugo Kerr erected a shrine to St. Gerard in the church in 1939.  Today the Novena continues to grow with over 10,000 people attending the Novena on a daily basis.

One memorable event of the Novena from years past was the trumpet players that performed at each of the sessions on the last day of the Novena.

Tradition
St. Gerard's Novena has become a lifelong tradition for many people. The annual novena sees more than 10,000 people from across the Dundalk area, and from counties Down, Armagh, Cavan, Monaghan, and Meath make the daily journey to the Redemptorist Church. As St. Gerard Majella is patron of expecting mothers, the novena is also a yearly pilgrimage for many women and couples hoping to welcome children into the lives. 

According to Novena Director Father Michael Cusack C.Ss.R., "This novena is always a time of great solidarity and really ignites the community spirit in the people of Dundalk and the surrounding counties, towns and villages."

The Novena consists of 10 sessions a day, with the first session starting at 7am, running all day until the last session at 10pm, when the mass is conducted by candlelight. Prayers and Petitions are offered up daily by members of the public and are read out during each session. Due to the increasing numbers attending the Novena each year extra seating is added to the hallways, monastery rooms, side altars and the parish hall, where each session is shown live on large television screens.

The last days of the Novena also see an increase in attendance as those who are unable to make it throughout the Novena usually attend the last three days.

Highlights of the Novena 
 Communal Celebration of the Sacrament of Reconciliation (usually on the 5th Day)
 Healing Mass with the Anointing of the Sick and the Elderly (held on the Saturday)
 The Blessing of Babies (2.30 pm service held on the Sunday)
 The Novena of All Nations (4.30pm on the Sunday)
 Taizé Mass – Candlelight Session. Nightly at 10.30pm
 Guest Speaker – lay people sharing their experience of life situations.

Prayer to St. Gerard Majella 
Almighty and Eternal God, we thank you for the gift of St. Gerard and the example of his life. Because St. Gerard always had complete faith and trust in you, you blessed him with great powers of help and healing. Through him, you showed your loving concern for all those who suffered or were in need. You never failed to hear his prayer on their behalf. Today, through St. Gerard's powerful intercession, you continue to show your love for all those who place their trust in you. And so, Father, full of faith and confidence, and in thanksgiving for all the wonderful things you have done for us, we place ourselves before you today. Through the intercession of St. Gerard, hear our petitions, and if it is your holy will, grant them.  Amen.

Hymn to St. Gerard Majella 
From Earth's Sorrow

From earth's sorrow, from life's tearland,
High above the clouds we gaze,
Where enthroned in starlike glory,
Reigns today the saint we praise.

Refrain
Saintly Gerard, Blessed Brother,
Thou whose heart did burn with love divine,
Friend of Jesus, child of Mary,
Make, O make our sinful hearts like thine.

Humble Gerard, lowly workman,
Patron of the hearts that toil,
Bless this bleak earth's myriad toilers,
Lift their thoughts above earth's soil.

To mark St. Gerard's Novena, the Novena prayers are also offered at Mass each day at the Dundalk Institute of Technology by the Chaplain's Office.

Notes

External links 
* https://web.archive.org/web/20071108232520/http://www.saintlucy.net/saintgerard.htm National Shrine of St Gerard
 
 The Dundalk Redemptorists Website
  Dublin Province
 The Redemptorists Irish Publications
 Website about St. Gerard Majella's life

Novena to St. Gerard Majella